Golden West Airlines  was a commuter airline that operated flights on a high volume schedule in California. It ceased operations in 1983.

History 
The original Golden West Airlines, headquartered at Van Nuys, California, was founded in 1968 and operated out of Terminal 4 at Los Angeles International Airport with a fleet of de Havilland Canada DHC-6 Twin Otter STOL capable turboprops and at least one HFB 320 Hansa Jet aircraft, serving Pomona, Riverside, Santa Ana, and Ventura.  This airline ceased operations on March 11, 1969.

Aero Commuter, founded in December 1967 and based in Long Beach, operated flights between Long Beach, Los Angeles International Airport (LAX), Avalon, Burbank, and Fullerton.  Aero Commuter operated de Havilland Canada DHC-6 Twin Otter STOL capable aircraft.  It also acquired Catalina Air Lines which had been founded in 1953 as Avalon Air Transport.  By 1968 service had expanded to include Apple Valley, Bakersfield, El Monte, Ontario, Oceanside, Palm Springs, Palmdale, San Diego, and Santa Ana.  In 1969, it merged with Skymark Airlines (a Sacramento-based charter and commuter airline founded in February 1968 that also operated the DHC-6 Twin Otter) and Cable Commuter Airlines (an Upland general aviation concern based at Cable Airport that had entered the scheduled commuter airline business in 1968 via a hub at Los Angeles International Airport (LAX) with flights to such southern California destinations to Burbank, Colton, Inyokern, Ontario, Oxnard, Palmdale, Palm Springs, Santa Ana (Orange County Airport), Santa Barbara and Santa Maria as well as service to Lake Havasu City in Arizona with all flights operated with DHC-6 Twin Otter aircraft).  Upon the demise of the original Golden West Airlines (see above) in early 1969, Aero Commuter acquired several assets from Golden West, including its name.  Golden West also briefly operated jet service with the HFB 320 Hansa Jet, a West German manufactured business jet configured with ten passenger seats which the airline flew in scheduled service from Burbank Airport (BUR, now Bob Hope Airport) to Santa Barbara (SBA) and Palm Springs (PSP) in 1969.

As Golden West Airlines it continued to expand aggressively through the 1970s, adding service to San Francisco (SFO), Oakland, Bakersfield, Fresno, Oxnard, Santa Rosa, Merced, Modesto,  Monterey, San Jose, Stockton and other smaller airports—many of which no longer have commercial service—such as Van Nuys Airport, Fullerton Municipal Airport, and the Airport in the Sky on Santa Catalina Island. In 1971 it attempted to acquire Los Angeles Airways, a local helicopter commuter airline, but the deal fell through. Golden West did acquire Catalina Air Lines, a seaplane operator that served Catalina Island off the coast of southern California with the Grumman G-21 Goose. These Grumman amphibious aircraft were operated as Catalina Golden West which was a division of Golden West.

Because of California's growth and tourist appeal, Golden West was able to become an interline partner with a number of domestic and international airlines.  According to the January 1, 1973 Golden West system timetable, these airlines included Aer Lingus, Aerolíneas Argentinas, Aeroméxico, Air Canada, Air France, Alaska Airlines, Allegheny Airlines, Aloha Airlines, American, Braniff International, Continental Airlines, Delta, Eastern, Finnair, Frontier Airlines, Hawaiian Airlines, Hughes Airwest, Japan Airlines (JAL), Lufthansa, National Airlines, Northeast Airlines, Ozark Air Lines, Pan American World Airways (Pan Am), Piedmont Airlines, Scandinavian Airline System (SAS), Southern Airways, Trans World Airlines (TWA), United Airlines, Western Airlines, Wien Air Alaska and other air carriers.

By the early 1980s, Golden West was the largest commuter airline in California operating a high frequency shuttle schedule between LAX and Santa Barbara and San Diego. In 1981, Golden West was the only air carrier flying nonstop between Santa Barbara and LAX with up to fourteen round trip flights a day.  Its fleet had grown to include larger aircraft such as the Short 330 and de Havilland Canada DHC-7 Dash 7. The 50-passenger seat Dash 7 was the largest aircraft ever operated by the airline.  A huge debt service, among other factors, drove Golden West Airlines out of business in April 1983.

In 2000, Pinnacle Air Charter, Inc. acquired the Air Carrier Certificate for Golden West Airlines.  It ultimately operated again, under the DBA of Pinnacle Air Charter, and later, Platinum Air Charter, Inc., conducting on-demand air charter and air ambulance operations under FAR Part 135.  Its base of operations was located at Pomona's Brackett Field, and conducted flight operations primarily out of San Bernardino International Airport.  It suspended operations and closed in 2007.

Fleet 

The Golden West fleet consisted of the following aircraft models and quantities.

 4 – Beechcraft Model 99 Airliner 
 27 – de Havilland Canada DHC-6 Twin Otter 
 5 – de Havilland Canada DHC-7 Dash 7 
 1 – Grumman G-21 Goose (amphibious aircraft that were formerly operated by Catalina Air Lines which was acquired by Golden West)
 1 − HFB 320 Hansa Jet 
 5 − Short 330

Destinations in 1982 

The July 1, 1982, Golden West timetable map includes:

 Bakersfield
 Fresno
 Lake Tahoe
 Los Angeles
 Monterey
 Ontario
 Orange County (now John Wayne Airport)
 Oxnard
 San Diego
 San Francisco
 Santa Barbara

Former destinations 
Santa Barbara

Before 1982, Golden West served the following at various times:

  Avalon Harbor Seaplane Base, Catalina Island (served by Golden West division Catalina Air Lines with Grumman Goose seaplanes)
 Catalina Airport (AVX) (also known as Airport in the Sky) 
 Edwards Air Force Base
 Fullerton Airport
 Inyokern
 Long Beach Airport (served by Golden West with DHC-6 Twin Otters and by Golden West division Catalina Air Lines with Grumman Goose seaplanes)
 McClellan-Palomar Airport
 Merced
 Modesto
 Mojave Airport
 Oakland
 Palmdale Airport
 Palm Springs
 Pomona (POC)
 Redlands Airport
 Riverside
 Sacramento
 San Jose
 Santa Rosa
 Stockton
 Tehachapi
 Trona
 Two Harbors Seaplane Base, Catalina Island (served by Golden West division Catalina Air Lines with Grumman Goose seaplanes)
 Vandenberg Air Force Base

Incidents and accidents

On January 9, 1975, Golden West Airlines Flight 261, a de Havilland Twin Otter, collided with a Cessna 150 over Whittier, California, killing 14 people in both aircraft (all 12 aboard the Golden West plane and the 2 occupants of the Cessna).

Sources

 R.E.G. Davies and I.E. Quastler, Commuter Airlines of the United States (Smithsonian Institution Press, 1995),

See also 
 List of defunct airlines of the United States

References

 
Defunct airlines of the United States
Companies based in Long Beach, California
Airlines established in 1967
Airlines disestablished in 1983
1967 establishments in California
1984 disestablishments in California
American companies established in 1967
Defunct seaplane operators
Airlines based in California